Falling Skies, a post-apocalyptic drama television series, premiered on June 19, 2011, in the United States on TNT, and concluded August 30, 2015, after 52 episodes over 5 seasons. Created by Robert Rodat, the series follows Tom Mason (Noah Wyle), a former Boston University history professor who becomes the second-in-command of the 2nd Massachusetts Militia Regiment, a group of civilians and fighters fleeing post-apocalyptic Boston. The show is produced by DreamWorks Television, with Steven Spielberg acting as an executive producer.

Series overview

Episodes

Season 1 (2011)

Season 2 (2012)

Season 3 (2013)

Season 4 (2014)

Season 5 (2015)

Ratings

References

External links 
 
 List of Falling Skies episodes at TNT
 
 

Falling Skies
Falling Skies episodes

fr:Falling Skies#Épisodes